Olmai, also rendered as Owlma and Ulma, may refer to:
 Olmai-ye Olya
 Olmai-ye Sofla